Ussassai is a comune (municipality) in the Province of Nuoro in the Italian region Sardinia, located about  northeast of Cagliari and about  southwest of Tortolì.

Ussassai borders the municipalities of Gairo, Osini, Seui, Ulassai.

Demographic evolution

References

Cities and towns in Sardinia